Mutbenret (Benretmut) was an Egyptian noblewoman, and said to be the sister of the Great Royal Wife Nefertiti. Her name used to be read as Mutnedjemet. The hieroglyphs for nedjem and bener are similar and so is their meaning. The name is now thought to be Mutbenret however.

One theory holds that Mutbenret was the same person as Mutnedjmet the wife of Horemheb, the last ruler of the Eighteenth Dynasty. But there is no conclusive evidence for this theory, and some challenge this theory.

Mutbenret appears in several of the Tombs of the Nobles at Amarna:
 In the tomb of Panehesy (tomb 6) the presence of two dwarfs on a lintel in a register associated with an offering scene indicate that Mutbenret was depicted nearby (probably in a register next to the royal princesses).

 Mutbenret is depicted behind the royal princesses in the award scene for Parennefer (tomb 7).

 Mutbenret is depicted in the award scene for Tutu in tomb 8. In the register below the King and Queen we see the Queen's Sister Mutbenret with her two dwarfs, several fan bearers and the nurses of the Princesses.
 In the tomb of May the royal family is shown worshipping the Aten. Akhenaten and Nefertiti are accompanied by three princesses. Meritaten and Meketaten are named as the two princesses in the lower register; the third princess depicted above them is most likely Ankhesenpaaten. All three are shown shaking a sistrum. Above the princesses we see the Queen's sister Mutbenret accompanied by her two dwarfs.
 The lintel in anonymous tomb 20 shows the royal family adoring the Aten. We see the same scene on the left and the right but in mirror image.  Akhenaten is shown on both sides wearing the Khepresh crown. Nefertiti and her daughters were never carved. The inscriptions show that Nefertiti was supposed to follow her husband, followed by Meritaten, Meketaten and Ankhesenpaaten. Behind the princesses we see the Queen's sister Mutbenret.
 In anonymous tomb 22, the lintel shows the royal family adoring the Aten. Akhenaten is shown wearing the Khepresh crown. Nefertiti, wearing her blue crown, followed her husband, followed by three princesses, probably Meritaten, Meketaten and Ankhesenpaaten. Behind the princesses we see the Queen's sister Mutbenret. 
 Mutbenret is depicted in the tomb of Ay (Southern Tomb 25), where she is shown as a young girl. Her formal titles include 'The Sister of the King's Chief Wife' (indicating a direct relationship with Nefertiti). Mutbenret is depicted in a scene on the thickness of an outer wall. She is accompanied by her two dwarfs Hemetniswerneheh and Mutef-Pre.

It is speculated that an alabaster piece found in Tutankhamen's tomb of a boat carrying a lady with a dwarf represents Mutbenret with one of these men.

References

14th-century BC Egyptian women
People of the Eighteenth Dynasty of Egypt
1300s BC deaths
Year of birth unknown